Boeckman Bridge was a historic suspension bridge located near St. Elizabeth, Miller County, Missouri.  It was built in 1926, and is a 240 foot long, wire cable and timber suspension (swinging) bridge.  It has zinc-clad main and suspender cables and flooring, stringers, floor beams and portals of untreated oak timbers.

It was added to the National Register of Historic Places in 1979.

References

Bridges on the National Register of Historic Places in Missouri
Bridges completed in 1926
Buildings and structures in Miller County, Missouri
National Register of Historic Places in Miller County, Missouri
Suspension bridges in Missouri